Holiday is a 2006 Indian romantic dance film produced and directed by Pooja Bhatt and starring Dino Morea, Gulshan Grover and Onjolee Nair. It is a remake of the 1987 American film Dirty Dancing.

Plot summary 
Muskaan (Onjolee Nair) is a shy, wealthy girl who visits Goa with her family. She meets Dino (Dino Morea), a dance performer at the holiday resort in Goa. His dance partner, Alysha (Kashmira Shah), is betrayed by a man who impregnates her, so Muskaan comes to her aid by replacing her in Dino and Alysha's dance routine. As Dino helps her train, love begins to bloom between them and problems arise. Muskaan's father does not approve of their pairing as he believes Dino is the man who impregnated Alysha.

Cast
 Dino Morea as Dino
 Kashmera Shah as Alisa
 Onjolee Nair as Muskaan
 Gulshan Grover as Dr. Daksh Suri, Muskan's Father
Jabed Ahmed Laskar as ACP  Jai Malhotra
 Nauheed Cyrusi as Samara
 Muskan Suri
 Anahita Uberoi as Nandini, Muskan's mother
 Sanjit Bedi
 Munmun Dutta as Shuli
 Ankur Desai
 Pooja Arora
 Yashodhan Bal

Music
Aashiyaan - Shreya Ghoshal, Vijay Prakash, Ranjit Barot, Amit Chatterjee
Aashiyaan (Remix) - Shreya Ghoshal, Vijay Prakash, Amit Chatterjee
Khwahishon Se - Shreya Ghoshal, Vijay Prakash, Ranjit Barot, Kunal Ganjawala, Nandini Srikar
Move With My Body - Dominique Cerejo, Ranjit Barot
Neele Neele Aasmaan Tale - Shreya Ghoshal, Vijay Prakash, Nandini Srikar
Raqs Kar Ley - Shaan, Vijay Prakash, Nandini Srikar
Sound Of The Future - Caralisa Monteiro, Ranjit Barot
Tauba - Ranjit Barot
Tu Hai Bhatakta Jugnu Koi - Shreya Ghoshal, Vijay Prakash, Nandini Srikar

References

External links
 

2006 films
2000s Hindi-language films
Films scored by Ranjit Barot
2000s dance films
Indian dance films
Indian remakes of American films